The Inconsolable Secret is the eighth studio album by American progressive rock band Glass Hammer, released on July 12, 2005, by Arion Records/Sound Resources.

It is the last album with singer Walter Moore as band member (though he would continue to collaborate with the band, including on 2014's Ode to Echo), and also the first without band leader Fred Schendel acting as drummer.

A special edition of the album was released on June 25, 2013, with an additional third disc featuring five songs entirely re-recorded by the band, with new members Jon Davison and Kamran Alan Shikoh on vocals and guitar respectively. The name "inconsolable secret" comes from C.S. Lewis's sermon, The Weight of Glory.

Track listing

Personnel

Glass Hammer
 Walter Moore – lead vocals
 Susie Bogdanowicz – lead vocals
 Fred Schendel – keyboards, electric and steel guitars, vocals
 Steve Babb – keyboards, bass, vocals

Additional musicians
 Matt Mendians – drums
 Sarah Snyder – vocals
 Flo Paris – vocals on “Long and Long Ago” and “Having Caught a Glimpse”
 Eric Parker – acoustic guitar
 The Adonia String Trio
 Rebecca James – violin
 Susan Hawkins-Whitacre – viola
 Rachel Hackenberger – cello
 Bethany Warren – backing vocals and choir
 Stephanie Rumpza – recorder and choir
 Haley McGuire, Summer Hullender, Elimy Hammett and Natalie Pittman – choir
 Tom Hammett – vocals
 Laura Lindstrom – vocals on “Morrigan’s Song”
 David Carter – lead guitar on "Long and Long Ago"

Production
 Fred Schendel and Steve Babb – production
 Bob Katz – mastering
 Roger Dean – cover art

New personnel in 2013 re-issue
 Jon Davison – lead vocals on "Long and Long Ago" and "The Morning She Woke"
 Kamran Alan Shikoh – electric and classical guitars on "The Morning She Woke" and "The Knight of the North"
 Johnny Bruhns – electric guitar on "Long And Long Ago"
 David Wallimann – electric guitar on "Having Caught A Glimpse"
 Donna Curry – flute on "Long And Long Ago" and "Having Caught A Glimpse"
 Kelly Luther Stultz – alto choir
 Josh Greene – baritone choir

References

Glass Hammer albums
2005 albums